Bergamin is a surname. Notable people with the surname include:

Claudio Bergamin, Chilean/Italian fantasy artist
Francisco Bergamín y García (1855–1937), Spanish lawyer, economist and politician
José Bergamín (1895–1983), Spanish writer, essayist, poet and playwright
Luciano Bergamin (born 1944), Italian clergyman and Roman Catholic Bishop of Nova Iguaçu in Brazil
Massimo Bergamin (born 1964), Italian politician

See also 
Bergamini